Valle de la Pascua is the capital city of the autonomous municipality of Leonardo Infante, Guárico, Venezuela .  The city is located in the central plains of Venezuela and was founded on February 25, 1785, by Father Mariano Martí. Along with Zaraza, Calabozo and San Juan de Los Morros (the state capital), Valle de la Pascua is one of the most important cities in the state of Guárico and the most important economically.  The vicinity of the city was the scene of the Battle of Valle de la Pascua in February 1814.

History
Valle de la Pascua was founded in the 18th century as part of the colonization and expansion of the Spanish presence on to the Alto Llano de Caracas, the name given to the central plains of the then Province of Venezuela, whose capital was Caracas.

In 1726, with the authorization of the government in Caracas, Capitán Francisco Carlos de Herrera, the regional administrator, granted the town of La Aguada de Valle de la Pascua together with the large cattle ranch called Santa Juana de la Cruz, to José Zamora.  However the origins of Spanish settlement started with cattle ranches founded by Francisco Zamora Granados and his brother-in-law, Gabriel Sánchez Sajonero, who, the year previously, had arrived from Altagracia de Orituco and settled in the valley with their families, equipment and cattle.

The Law of Territorial Division of Gran Colombia, dated 25 June 1824, divided the Province of Caracas, of the Department of Venezuela, into twelve cantons (counties). Valle de la Pascua was placed in Chaguaramas canton. In 1848, by the presidential order of General José Tadeo Monagas, the Province of Caracas was redivided into four cantons and twenty-seven parishes. The parish of Valle de la Pascua was placed together with the canton capital of Chaguaramas, and the parishes of Chaguramal del Peral, Santa María de Ipire, Altamira, Altagracia de Iguana, Espino, Cabruta and Santa Rita de Manapire into Chaguaramas canton. In 1853 the canton of Chaguaramas was divided in two: Chaguaramas and Unare. Chaguaramas kept the town of Chaguaramas, Valle de la Pascua, Espino, Cabruta and Santa Rita de Manapire.

Candlemas Fairs
In the winter of 1939–1940 during their Candlemas Fiesta (Festival), Valle de la Pascua held a Candlemas Fair.  That year they had over 15,000 visitors. The fairs provide both entertainment and the opportunity to show the products from the region.

Economy

This city is known for its agricultural and livestock and for being one of the most important industrial areas of the Venezuelan Llanos.

It has a population of approximately 182,000 inhabitants, which are devoted mostly to industrial activities and agricultural and professional.

Sites in the area include the Cathedral of Our Lady of Candlemas, the House of the Islanders, Ruben Zamora Church and Casa de la Cultura. It is a quite popular with tourists for tours of the countryside rangers, through companies that organize tours that lead to sites such as the artificial lake and the dam of Playa de Piedra.

Valle de la Pascua is situated within Guarico state, along with Calabozo and San Juan de Los Morros (state capital).

Media

Radio stations 
Radio Enlace 860 AM
Joropo 88.1 FM
RNV 88.9 FM (Canal informativo)
Onda la SuperEstacion 89.7 FM
Auténtica 90.5 FM
Socialista 91.5 FM
Genuina 92.5 FM
Guerrera 93.5 FM
Vida 94.1 FM
Ambiente 96.1 FM
Mega Latina 97.9 FM
Deportiva 98.3 FM
Exitosa 98.9 FM
Garza Stereo 99.5 FM
Alternativa 100.7 FM
Buenísima Plus 101.5 FM
Platino 102.3 FM
Tiempo de Dios 104.5 FM
Popular106.1 FM
Luz 106.7 FM
Stilo 107.1 FM
Fortaleza 107.9 FM

Television 
 Tu TV (Canal 3)
 Buenísima Plus TV (Canal 20)
 Luz TV (Canal 22)

Daily journal 
 Jornada
 La Prensa
 La Antena

Education 

 Universidad Nacional Experimental Simón Rodríguez
 Universidad Nacional Experimental de los Llanos Centrales Rómulo Gallegos
 Universidad Nacional Abierta
 Universidad Pedagógica Experimental Libertador
 Universidad Bolivariana de Venezuela
 Instituto Universitario de Tecnología de los Llanos (IUTLL)
 Universidad Nacional Experimental Romulo Gallegos Hospital Universitario.

References 

This article is based in part on material from the Spanish Wikipedia.

External links 

 Valle de la Pascua MiPunto.com in Spanish;

 
Cities in Guárico